The South African Trades Union Congress (TUC) was a national trade union federation in South Africa.

The council was established in 1924, as the South African Association of Employees' Organisations. It was founded at a special congress, held after the collapse of the South African Industrial Federation, which was called by the Minister of Labour, Frederic Creswell.  All the affiliated unions were registered under the Industrial Conciliation Act 1924 and represented white workers.  The federation was expected to be very moderate, but unexpectedly elected the leading communist Bill Andrews as its general secretary.  As president, it elected Jimmy Briggs, a Labour Party Senator.

The unexpected radicalism of the federation led some long-established unions not to affiliate, while the Mine Workers' Union and South African Typographical Union soon resigned their membership.  They were replaced by small industrial unions, many open to all workers.  The federation also began working closely with the South African Federation of Non-European Trade Unions.  In 1930, the federation merged with the Cape Federation of Labour Unions, forming the South African Trades and Labour Council.

Affiliates
The federation's founding affiliates were:

References

Defunct trade unions in South Africa
Trade unions established in 1924
Trade unions disestablished in 1930